Märjamaa is a borough in Rapla County, Estonia. It is the administrative center of Märjamaa Parish. Märjamaa has a population of 2,961 as of 29 November 2012, making it the largest settlement in the whole of Märjamaa Parish.

Notable people
Ivo Eensalu (born 1949), actor and theatre director
Arvo Valton (born 1935), writer
Artur Uritamm (1901–1982), composer, taught music in Märjamaa from 1950 to 1955

See also
RFC Märjamaa

References

External links
Märjamaa 360° aerial panorama / photo
Märjamaa Parish 

Boroughs and small boroughs in Estonia
Former municipalities of Estonia
Kreis Wiek